David Deligny (born 6 August 1993) is a French footballer who plays as a midfielder for Auchel 62 district 2.

External links

 

1993 births
Living people
Association football midfielders
French footballers
RC Lens players
Clermont Foot players
F91 Dudelange players
FC RM Hamm Benfica players
Ligue 2 players